EFSS may refer to:

 Enterprise file synchronization and sharing (enterprise file sync and share), software to securely share documents
 Edgefield Secondary School, Punggol, Singapore
 M327 Expeditionary Fire Support System (mortar), see List of crew-served weapons of the U.S. Armed Forces
 M1163 Expeditionary Fire Support System (jeep), see List of currently active United States military land vehicles
 LAV Expeditionary Fire Support System (armored car), see List of vehicles of the United States Marine Corps

See also

 
 
 EFS (disambiguation)